MTV Sports: Snowboarding is a snowboarding video game developed by Radical Entertainment and published by THQ for the PlayStation in 1999.

Gameplay
MTV Sports: Snowboarding is a snowboarding competition game in which players must pass the training and qualifying rounds to move on to the main competition.

Reception

The game received "average" reviews according to the review aggregation website GameRankings. Adam Pavlacka of NextGen said, "If you've tired of the Cool Boarders series and are seeking a new challenge, look no further. The next great snowboarding game has arrived on PlayStation."

References

External links
 

1999 video games
MTV video games
PlayStation (console) games
PlayStation (console)-only games
Radical Entertainment games
Snowboarding video games
THQ games
Video games developed in Canada